The 2019 Ligue Haïtienne is the 56th season of the Ligue Haïtienne, the top-tier football league in Haiti. The league Championnat National Haïtien Professionnel is split into two tournaments — the Série d'Ouverture and the Série de Clôture — each with identical formats and each contested by the same 16 teams. The season began on 2 March 2019.

Due to unrest in the country, no further matches were played after 22 September. The season was formally abandoned on 18 December.

Teams

At the end of the 2018 season, the bottom three teams in the aggregate table; AS Sud-Est, Valencia, and Petit-Goâve; were relegated to the Haitian second-level leagues. Replacing them were three clubs from the Haitian second-level leagues; Violette AC, Triomphe and América.

Série d'Ouverture

Regular season
The regular season began on 2 March and ended on 19 May.

Standings

Results

Playoffs

Quarterfinals
The first legs were played on 23 and 24 May and the second legs were played on 26 and 27 May.

The first leg match between Don Bosco and Tempête was begun on 23 May, but the game was abandoned at halftime due to rain. The game was replayed the next day.

Semifinals
The first legs were played on 29 and 30 May and the second legs were played on 1 and 2 June.

Finals
The first leg was played on 6 June and the second leg was played on 9 June. Winner qualifies for 2020 Caribbean Club Championship.

Série de Clôture

Regular season
The regular season began on 24 August.

Standings

Results

Playoffs

Quarterfinals

Semifinals

Finals
Winner qualifies for 2020 Caribbean Club Championship.

Trophée des Champions
Played between champions of Série d'Ouverture and Série de Clôture.

Aggregate table
Due to the abandonment of the season, no clubs were relegated for next season.

References

2019
Haiti
Ligue Haitienne